Spectamen is a genus of small sea snails, marine gastropod molluscs in the family Solariellidae within the superfamily Trochoidea.

Distribution
This marine genus occurs off Australia, South Africa, Indonesia and the Philippines.

Species 
Species within the genus Spectamen include:
 Spectamen adarticulatum (Barnard, 1963)
 Spectamen aratum (Hedley, 1903)
 Spectamen babylonia Vilvens, 2009
 Spectamen basilicum (B. A. Marshall, 1999)
 Spectamen bellulum (Angas, 1869)
 Spectamen benthicola (Powell, 1937)
 † Spectamen carinatum (Laws, 1935) 
 Spectamen cinctum (Cotton & Godfrey, 1938)
 Spectamen cinereum (Preston, 1909)
 Spectamen epitheca (Iredale, 1929)
 Spectamen euteium (Vilvens, 2009)
 Spectamen exiguum (B. A. Marshall, 1999)
 Spectamen flavidum (B. A. Marshall, 1999)
 Spectamen flavum (Herbert, 1987)
 † Spectamen fossa (Laws, 1932) 
 Spectamen franciscanum (Barnard, 1963)
 Spectamen gertruda (Iredale, 1936)
 Spectamen gerula Herbert, 1987
 Spectamen geruloides Herbert, 1987
 Spectamen laevior (Schepman, 1908)
  † Spectamen lenis (Marwick, 1928)
 Spectamen luteolum (Powell, 1937)
 Spectamen marsus Cotton & Godfrey, 1938
 Spectamen martensi (Herbert, 2015)
 Spectamen multistriatum (Thiele, 1925)
 Spectamen mutabile (Schepman, 1908)
 † Spectamen ordo (Laws, 1941) 
 Spectamen pardalis Herbert, 1987
 Spectamen philippense (Watson, 1881)
 Spectamen plicatulum (Murdoch & Suter, 1906)
 Spectamen pulcherrimum (Angas, 1869)
 Spectamen roseapicale Herbert, 1987
 Spectamen rubiolae Herbert, 1987
 Spectamen ruthae Herbert, 1987
 Spectamen semireticulatum (Suter, 1908)
 Spectamen sulculiferum Herbert, 1987
 Spectamen tryphenense (Powell, 1930)
 † Spectamen venustum (P. A. Maxwell, 1969) 
 Spectamen verum (Powell, 1937)

 Species brought into synonymy
 Spectamen corallinum (Cotton & Godfrey, 1935): synonym of Argalista corallina (Cotton & Godfrey, 1935)
 † Spectamen marshalli P. A. Maxwell, 1992: synonym of † Solariella marshalli (P. A. Maxwell, 1992) 
 Spectamen meridianum (Dell, 1953): synonym of Elaphriella meridiana (Dell, 1953)
 Spectamen rikae Vilvens, 2003 has become a Cyclophoridae incertae sedis  (terrestrial taxon named as marine)
 Spectamen semisculptum (Martens, 1904): synonym of Zetela semisculpta (E. von Martens, 1904)
 Spectamen turbynei (Barnard, 1963): synonym of Zetela turbynei (Barnard, 1963)

References

 Ludbrook, N. H. (1956). The molluscan fauna of the Pliocene strata underlying the Adelaide Plains. Part 3. Scaphopoda, Polyplacophora, Gastropoda (Haliotidae to Tornidae). Transactions of the Royal Society of South Australia. 79 : 1-36
 Cotton, B.C. (1959). South Australian Mollusca. Archaeogastropoda. Adelaide : Govt. Printer. pp. 1–449.
 Iredale, T. & McMichael, D.F., 1962 .A reference list of the marine Mollusca of New South Wales. Mem. Aust. Mus., 11:0-0.
 Powell, A.W.B., 1974. New Zealand molluscan systematics with descriptions of new species. Part 8. Rec. Auckland Inst. Mus., 11:197-207
 Williams S.T., Karube S. & Ozawa T. (2008) Molecular systematics of Vetigastropoda: Trochidae, Turbinidae and Trochoidea redefined. Zoologica Scripta 37: 483–506

 
Solariellidae
Gastropod genera